Pará was the lead ship of  destroyers of the Brazilian Navy, serving from 1909 to 1936. She was named after the Brazilian state of Pará.

Description and Construction

In 1904 Brazil adopted an ambitious plan to renovate and modernize its Navy. The Naval Renovation Program was negotiated and enacted in December 1904 and envisioned acquisition of large number of vessels, including a dozen destroyers. In 1906 the program was modified reducing the total number of destroyers to ten. These ships became known as  destroyers.

Steam for the turbines was provided by two double-ended Yarrow boilers. During the trials Pará ran  to the ton of coal.

The ship mounted two  guns in single mounts. In addition, four 47 mm (3pdr) cannons in single mounts were deployed at the time of launching.

The official full speed trial for Pará took place on September 16, 1908 in the Firth of the Clyde. During a continuous three hour run with a 100 ton load, the ship exceeded her contract speed of 27 knots.

Her first commander was Captain Felinto Perry.

Incidents during construction
On November 19, 1908, while leaving the Yarrow yard for Greenock Pará collided with a hopper barge. The destroyer sustained only minor damage and proceeded to her destination.

References

Bibliography 
 Gardiner, Robert and Randal Gray, eds. Conway's All the World's Fighting Ships 1906–1921. Annapolis: Naval Institute Press, 1985. . .
 "CT Pará - CT 2." Navios De Guerra Brasileiros. Accessed 27 August 2017.
 "Pará IV." Serviço de Documentação da Marinha — Histórico de Navios. Diretoria do Patrimônio Histórico e Documentação da Marinha, Departamento de História Marítima. Accessed 19 August 2017.

Pará-class destroyers (1908)
1908 ships
Ships built in Glasgow